Mona Barrie (born Mona Barlee Smith; 18 December 1909 – 27 June 1964) was an English-born actress, active on stage in Australia before establishing a career in the US, and in Hollywood films.

Career
Born Mona Barlee Smith in London to comedian Phil Smith and variety performer Jessie Barlee, she lived in Australia from 1913, and made her professional debut as Mona Barlee on stage in a 1922 J. C. Williamson production of The Merry Widow. For the next ten years she performed for J.C. Williamson's, mostly in musical comedies and earning a popular reputation, appearing with numerous Australian based variety stars including Roy Rene. She also appeared in her first film, His Royal Highness, with Australian comedian George Wallace. 
In 1933 she emigrated to New York, was given a test for films and this led to signing with Fox Film Corporation. She made her first US film Sleepers East using the stage name Mona Barrie.

While her lack of a glamorous beauty resulted in her generally being cast in important but secondary roles, during a film career spanning almost twenty years she appeared in more than fifty films. She co-starred in 1942's Dawn on the Great Divide, the last film Buck Jones made before he died in the Cocoanut Grove fire in Boston, Massachusetts. Barrie also performed at various playhouses across the U.S, debuting on Broadway in 1937 as Lady Agatha in Arthur Schwartz's Virginia.  

For her contributions to the film industry, Barrie received a motion pictures star on the Hollywood Walk of Fame in 1960. Her star is located at 6140 Hollywood Boulevard.

Personal life
She married Charles Harold Rayson in Melbourne, Australia, in July 1928, however the marriage was not a success and a divorce was granted in 1931. In 1938 she married Canadian Paul Macklin Bolton. Both unions were childless.

Barrie died in 1964 in Los Angeles, aged 54, from undisclosed causes. She and Bolton are interred together in the Knox United Church Cemetery in Agincourt, Toronto.

Family
Barrie's sister, Rene Barlee, was a variety artist in Australia in the 1920s, while her brother, Roly Barlee, was chief announcer for Melbourne radio station 3UZ.

Partial filmography

 His Royal Highness (1932)
 Carolina (1934) - Virginia Buchanan
 Sleepers East (1934) - Ada Robillard
 All Men Are Enemies (1934) - Margaret Scrope
 Such Women Are Dangerous (1934) - Wanda Paris
 One Night of Love (1934) - Rosa Lally
 Charlie Chan in London (1934) - Lady Mary Bristol
 I'll Fix It (1934) - Anne Barry
 Mystery Woman (1935) - Margaret Benoit
 Storm Over the Andes (1935) - Theresa
 The Unwelcome Stranger (1935) - Madeline Chamberlain
 Ladies Love Danger (1935) - Rita Witherspoon
 The Melody Lingers On (1935) - Sylvia Turina
 King of Burlesque (1936) - Rosalind Cleve
 Here Comes Trouble (1936) - Evelyn Howard
 A Message to Garcia (1936) - Spanish Spy
 Love on the Run (1936) - Baroness Hilda
 Mountain Justice (1937) - Evelyn Wayne
 I Met Him in Paris (1937) - Helen Anders
 Something to Sing About (1937) - Stephanie 'Steffie' Hajos
 Love, Honor and Behave (1938) - Lisa Blake
 Men Are Such Fools (1938) - Beatrice Harris
 Say It in French (1938) - Lady Westover
 I Take This Woman (1940) - Sandra Mayberry
 Love, Honor, and Oh Baby! (1940) - Deedee Doree
 Who Killed Aunt Maggie? (1940) - Eve Benedict
 Lady with Red Hair (1940) - Mrs. Brooks
 Murder Among Friends (1941) - Clair Turk
 When Ladies Meet (1941) - Mabel Guiness
 Never Give a Sucker an Even Break (1941) - The Producer's Wife
 Ellery Queen and the Murder Ring (1941) - Nurse Marian Tracy
 Skylark (1941) - Charlette Gorell
 Road to Happiness (1941) - Millie Rankin
 Today I Hang (1942) - Martha Courtney
 A Tragedy at Midnight (1942) - Alta Wilton
 The Strange Case of Doctor Rx (1942) - Eileen Crispin
 Syncopation (1942) - Lillian
 Lady in a Jam (1942) - Woman (uncredited)
 Cairo (1942) - Mrs. Morrison
 Dawn on the Great Divide (1942) - Sadie Rand
 One Dangerous Night (1943) - Jane Merrick
 Storm Over Lisbon (1944) - Evelyn
 Just Before Dawn (1946) - Harriet Travers
 The Devil's Mask (1946) - Louise Mitchell
 The Secret of the Whistler (1946) - Linda Vail
 I Cover Big Town (1947) - Dora Hilton
 When a Girl's Beautiful (1947) - Cordova
 Cass Timberlane (1947) - Avis Elderman
 My Dog Rusty (1948) - Dr. Toni Cordell
 The First Time (1952) - Cassie Mayhew
 Strange Fascination (1952) - Diana Fowler
 Plunder of the Sun (1953) - Tourist (uncredited) (final film role)

References

External links

Photographs of Mona Barrie

1909 births
1964 deaths
20th-century English actresses
Actresses from London
British expatriate actresses in Australia
British emigrants to the United States
English film actresses
English stage actresses